Satish Kumar is Indian activist and editor.

Satish Kumar may also refer to:

 Satish Kumar (athlete), Indian athlete
 Satish Kumar (boxer) (born 1989), Indian boxer
 Satish Kumar Jr (born 1988), Indian footballer
 Satish Kumar, Indian serial killer usually referred to by his first name